Wolfeboro is a town in Carroll County, New Hampshire, United States. The population was 6,416 at the 2020 census. A resort area situated beside Lake Winnipesaukee, Wolfeboro includes the village of Wolfeboro Falls.

History

The town was granted by colonial Governor Benning Wentworth in 1759 to four young men of Portsmouth, and named "Wolfeborough" in honor of English General James Wolfe, who had been victorious at the Battle of the Plains of Abraham in 1759 during the French and Indian War. In 1763,  were added to the  reserved for the governor. Colonial Governor John Wentworth, Benning Wentworth's nephew, established an estate on the site, known as Kingswood. Built in 1771 beside what is now called Lake Wentworth, this was the first summer country estate in northern New England. Settled in 1768, the town was incorporated in 1770.

Over the years Wolfeboro, whose town motto is  "The Oldest Summer Resort in America", became a popular summer colony, particularly for families from Boston and southern New Hampshire. Prince Rainier and Princess Grace of Monaco, Kurt Vonnegut, Drew Barrymore and Jimmy Fallon have spent time in Wolfeboro. In August 2007, then French president Nicolas Sarkozy vacationed there.

In May 2014, it was discovered that 82-year-old police commissioner Robert Copeland had been overheard in a cafe two months earlier using a racial epithet to refer to then President Barack Obama. Copeland acknowledged in an email to his colleagues that he did in fact use the word, saying "for this, I do not apologize — he meets and exceeds my criteria for such." At a subsequent meeting with residents, Copeland refused calls for his resignation. A few days later, he submitted his resignation.

Geography

The main village of Wolfeboro is located at the head of Wolfeboro Bay on Lake Winnipesaukee, at the junction of New Hampshire routes 28 and 109. Wolfeboro Falls is just  to the north along Routes 28/109.

Wolfeboro is drained by the Smith River, which is the outlet of Lake Wentworth and an inlet of Lake Winnipesaukee. Via Winnipesaukee, the town is part of the Merrimack River watershed.

The town is home to Wentworth State Park, a  state park on the shore of Lake Wentworth.

Adjacent municipalities
 Ossipee (north)
 Wakefield (east)
 Brookfield (east)
 New Durham (southeast)
 Alton (south)
 Tuftonboro (west)

Demographics

As of the 2010 census, there were 6,269 people, 2,839 households, and 1,848 families residing in the town. There were 4,443 housing units, of which 1,604 (36.1%) were vacant. 1,322 of the vacant units were vacation properties or seasonal homes. The racial makeup of the town was 97.6% White, 0.2% African American, 0.2% Native American, 0.8% Asian, 0.02% Pacific Islander, 0.2% some other race, and 1.0% from two or more races. 1.3% of the population were Hispanic or Latino of any race.

Of the 2,839 households in the town, 22.6% had children under the age of 18 living with them, 54.2% were headed by married couples living together, 7.7% had a female householder with no husband present, and 34.9% were non-families. 30.4% of all households were made up of individuals, and 16.6% were someone living alone who was 65 years of age or older. The average household size was 2.18, and the average family size was 2.68.
 
In the town, 17.9% of the population were under the age of 18, 4.8% were from 18 to 24, 15.8% were from 25 to 44, 33.5% were from 45 to 64, and 28.0% were 65 years of age or older. The median age was 52.1 years. For every 100 females, there were 91.4 males. For every 100 females age 18 and over, there were 88.6 males.

For the period 2011–2015, the estimated median annual income for a household in the town was $58,204, and the median income for a family was $68,409. Male full-time workers had a median income of $51,466 versus $41,288 for females. The per capita income for the town was $35,307. 7.4% of the population and 4.2% of families were below the poverty line. 10.4% of residents under the age of 18 were living in poverty, compare to 0.7% of those aged 65 or older.

Notable people 

 Jeb Bradley (born 1952), Majority Leader of the New Hampshire Senate; US congressman (2003–2007)
 Tim Corbin (born 1961), head coach of Vanderbilt Commodores baseball, two-time NCAA champion
 James Foley (1973–), freelance war correspondent during the Syrian Civil War, he was abducted on November 22, 2012, in northwestern Syria and subsequently beheaded in August 2014 purportedly as a response to American airstrikes in Iraq, thus becoming the first American citizen killed by the Islamic State of Iraq and Syria (ISIS)
 Robbie Ftorek (born 1952), former NHL head coach of the Los Angeles Kings, New Jersey Devils and Boston Bruins; current head coach of the Norfolk Admirals of the ECHL
 J. W. "Bill" Marriott, Jr. (born 1932), executive chairman and chairman of the board of Marriott International (summer resident)
 Dennis Moran (1982–2013), a.k.a. "Coolio" and/or "Sinned", computer hacker
 Mitt Romney (born 1947), 70th governor of Massachusetts, presidential candidate, U.S. senator from Utah (summer resident)
 Mike Ryan (1941–2020), catcher with the Boston Red Sox, Philadelphia Phillies, and Pittsburgh Pirates
 Soong Mei-ling (1898-2003), wife of Republic of China President Chiang Kai-shek
 Sir John Wentworth, 1st Baronet (1737–1820), provincial governor of New Hampshire (summer resident)

Education
Wolfeboro is served by Kingswood Regional High School, located on Main Street southeast of the center of town. Adjoining the high school is Kingswood Regional Middle School. The two elementary schools located in the community are Carpenter and Crescent Lake. All of the aforementioned schools are part of the Governor Wentworth Regional School District, which includes five additional towns.  The town is also home to Brewster Academy, a private preparatory school.

The Wolfeboro Camp School, which converted the Hill School Camp, enrolls 200 students domestic and international.

Health care 
Wolfeboro's largest health care facility is Huggins Hospital, a non-profit hospital that serves the communities of Alton, Brookfield, Effingham, Freedom, Madison, Moultonborough, New Durham, Ossipee, Sanbornville, Sandwich, Tamworth, Tuftonboro, Wakefield, Wolfeboro, and other surrounding towns. Huggins is a Critical Access Hospital (CAH). CAHs are hospitals with no more than 25 inpatient beds; Huggins has 25. Huggins has a relationship with the Dartmouth-Hitchcock Air Transport Service (DHART) that can provide trauma victims access to helicopter in as little as 20 minutes, so they can be transported to the Dartmouth–Hitchcock Medical Center.

Historic images

Sites of interest

 Clark House (1778)
 Monitor Engine Company Firehouse
 MS Mount Washington 
 New Hampshire Boat Museum
 Pleasant Valley Schoolhouse
 Wright Museum of WWII History
 Wolfeboro Public Library Postcard Archive

On the National Register of Historic Places:
 Brewster Memorial Hall
 Cotton Mountain Community Church
 Libby Museum
 Pickering House

References

External links

 
 Wolfeboro Historical Society
 Wolfeboro Public Library
 Wolfeboro Community Profile from the NH Economic and Labor Market Information Bureau
 Huggins Hospital

 
Towns in Carroll County, New Hampshire
1759 establishments in the Thirteen Colonies
Towns in New Hampshire
Populated places on Lake Winnipesaukee